Cradle 2 the Grave is the soundtrack to Andrzej Bartkowiak's 2003 action film Cradle 2 the Grave. It was released on February 18, 2003 through Bloodline Records and Def Jam Recordings. Recording sessions took place at Quad Recording Studios, at Teamwork Music Studios, at Chung King Studios, at Right Track Recording, at Sony Music Studios, at Sound On Sound, at The Hit Factory, at Soul Clap Studios, and at Gold Mine Studios in New York, at the Room Lab in Hackensack, at the Studio in Philadelphia, at Soundcastle in California, at Enterprise Studios in Burbank, at Larrabee West in West Hollywood, and at Battery Studios in Chicago. 

Production was handled by several record producers, including Shatek King, DJ Envy, Dame Grease, Elite, Eminem, Mannie Fresh, Tony Pizarro and Sha Money XL. It features contributions from film star DMX, alongside Birdman, C-N-N, Drag-On, Fat Joe, Foxy Brown, G-Unit, Joe Budden, M.O.P., Obie Trice and the Clipse among others.

The soundtrack was very successful, peaking at number 6 on the Billboard 200, number 3 on the Top R&B/Hip-Hop Albums and number 1 on the Top Soundtracks, also the soundtrack included DMX's single, "X Gon' Give It to Ya". The soundtrack was also certified gold by the Recording Industry Association of America on May 19, 2003, with over 500,000 copies sold.

The song "Go to Sleep" has been used as the entrance song to UFC fighters Sam Stout and Dan Cramer.

Critical reception

AllMusic writer John Bush found the opening track up there with the rest of DMX's work but said it "doesn't sound too special". He added that he was surprised by the contributions from Foxy Brown and Drag-On, saying that "My Life (Cradle 2 the Grave)" had Brown being "curiously reflective (and more than just a bit poignant)" and the samples of The Temptations and Marvin Gaye used on "Fireman" make it "sound[s] completely original". Steve Juon of RapReviews said, "Taken as a whole Cradle 2 the Grave is about par for most compilations, soundtrack or otherwise, released in the last twelve months. With a few nice surprises [...] this soundtrack is slightly better than most. It's not an overwhelming success, but it's good enough to ensure that DMX fans won't be calling for his head if the movie tanks".

Track listing

Charts

Weekly charts

Year-end charts

Certifications

References

External links

2003 soundtrack albums
Hip hop soundtracks
Gangsta rap soundtracks
Albums produced by Eminem
Albums produced by Dame Grease
Def Jam Recordings soundtracks
Albums produced by Mannie Fresh
Ruff Ryders Entertainment albums
Action film soundtracks